Aleksandar Minić (born ) is a Montenegrin male volleyball player. He is part of the Montenegro men's national volleyball team.

References

External links
 profile at FIVB.org

1986 births
Living people
Montenegrin men's volleyball players
Place of birth missing (living people)